Remember When is the debut studio album by American band The Orwells. It was released August 7, 2012, on Autumn Tone Records.

Track list

References

2012 debut albums
The Orwells albums